Heinz Meister is a prolific board game designer from Germany. He is credited as the designer of over 150 board games or game items. Only a few game designers from Germany such as Reiner Knizia, Wolfgang Kramer, and Michael Schacht are known to have more tabletop game design credits. Meister won the Kinderspiel des Jahres award for best children's game in 1995 with Karambolage and in 1992 for Galloping Pigs.

References

External links
 Heinz Meister: boardgamegeek.com designer entry
 Heinz Meister game database luding.org (German)

Living people
Board game designers
German designers
Year of birth missing (living people)